El Ezzeiat is a village in eastern Libya on the Charruba–Timimi Road.

Populated places in Derna District